Pool Academy is a mixed secondary school with academy status, located in Pool in the English county of Cornwall.

History 
Although other schools had been in the area previously the original Pool School building was opened in 1896. In 1973 work began on a new site across Church Rd and adjacent to Trevenson Church. The school operated between both sites until 2003 when new buildings were added as part of the PFI Schools building scheme. The now listed Victorian school is currently being converted into housing.  The school has been known as Pool Comprehensive School and Pool School and Community College before gaining specialist status when it was renamed Pool Business and Enterprise College. The school was converted to academy status on 1 April 2011 and was renamed Pool Academy.

Pool Academy offers GCSEs as programmes of study for pupils. The school is also the home ground of Duchy Hockey Club.

In 2016, Dagmara Przybysz, a 16-year-old student of Pool Academy, was found hanged in the school's bathroom.  During an inquest, testimony was reportedly received that she had suffered bullying over her Polish nationality. However the school had received no reports of racism  and the coroner recorded an open verdict concluding that there was no evidence of mental health issues “or any significant racism or bullying issues immediately prior to death" 

In January 2019, the Department for Education (DfE) named it among the "Worst Schools In The Country."

References

External links

 

Secondary schools in Cornwall
Academies in Cornwall